The Sea Rose (French: La rose de la mer) is a 1946 French drama film directed by Jacques de Baroncelli and starring Denise Bosc, Fernand Ledoux and Roger Pigaut. The film's sets were designed by the art director Paul-Louis Boutié.

Synopsis
Jérôme his uncle Romain own an old cargo ship. When he discovers that Romain and his dishonest crew plan to scuttle the ship for insurance money he attempts to prevent them.

Cast

References

Bibliography 
 Goble, Alan. The Complete Index to Literary Sources in Film. Walter de Gruyter, 1999.

External links 
 

1946 films
1946 drama films
French drama films
1940s French-language films
Films directed by Jacques de Baroncelli
Films based on French novels
French black-and-white films
1940s French films